David Ham (1830–1908) was a gold miner and politician in Victoria, Australia. He was a Member of the Victorian Legislative Council from 1886 to 1904.

Early life 
David Ham was born in November 1830 in Cornwall, England.

Victorian enterprises 
He immigrated to Victoria in 1849 and spent two years farming at Indented Head. He then went to the Victorian goldfields where he amassed a fortune, partly through gold prospecting and partly through establishing businesses on the goldfields, such as store keeping, butchering and saw-milling.

In 1861 he settled in Ballarat as a land agent, auctioneer and stock broker.

He was an active member of the Wesleyan Church  in Melbourne, Ballarat and Queenscliff, and was known for his philanthropy.

Politics 
He was elected a Member of the Victorian Legislative Council in 1886 and remained in the council until its reduction in size in 1904 when he retired.

Later life 
Ham died at Queenscliff, Victoria in January 1908 from pneumonia, following a chill he caught when bathing.

References 

Members of the Victorian Legislative Council
1830 births
1908 deaths
19th-century Australian politicians